The Syrian brown bear (Ursus arctos syriacus or Ursus arctos arctos) is a relatively small subspecies of brown bear native to the Middle East and the Caucasus mountain range.

Characteristics 

The Syrian brown bear's fur is usually very light brown and straw-coloured. The hair on the withers is longer with a grey-brown base and is often a different shade from the rest of the body, seen in some individuals as a dark stripe running across the back. The lighter colors usually appear at higher altitudes. Their legs are commonly darker than the rest of their body. It is the only known bear in the world to have white claws. It is a rather small brown bear.

Populations in the Caucasus were thought to belong to Ursus arctus syriacus and to overlap those of the Eurasian brown bear. They are larger in size and darker. In the past, some naturalists proposed that Caucasian bears belonged to hybrid populations between Eurasian and Syrian brown bears, but results of genetic studies show that all populations in the Caucasus are Eurasian brown bears. It was thought that these mixed bears originated during the Holocene when Syrian brown bears supposedly migrated northward and interbred with the larger northern bears. Today, that hypothesis is considered by experts to be wrong. Litter size ranges from one to three cubs.

Distribution and habitat 
Historically, the brown bear occurred in the Middle East from Turkey to Turkmenistan.
Today, the brown bear is extirpated in Jordan, Israel, and Palestine, and survives only in Turkey, Iran and Iraq.
In Syria, brown bear tracks were recorded in the snow in the Anti-Lebanon Mountains in 2004 for the first time in five decades. In February 2011, bear tracks were again recorded in this area.

In Turkey, important habitats are Mediterranean belt forests, deciduous and conifer forests in the Black Sea region and northeastern Turkey, oak and pine forests in the hinterlands of the Black Sea, and dry forests in East Anatolia.
In Iran, it is present in the Central Alborz Protected Area south of the Caspian Sea and in the Zagros Mountains. In these regions, it prefers higher altitudes and northern aspects with access to water resources.

Threats 
In Turkey, the bear is threatened by large-scale forest fragmentation, degradation of habitat, and persecution in areas where it damages beehives and livestock. Local people in the Black Sea region hunt bears illegally for bear fat, which is thought to have medicinal value. Occasionally, bears are killed during hunts for wild boar using dogs, and by poisoned baits and snares set illegally for red deer, roe deer, wolf or lynx.

In 2018, a sleeping Syrian brown bear was killed by Iraqi forces at the Iraq-Syria border.

In culture 

The Syrian brown bear is the bear mentioned in the Bible. The protectiveness of a mother bear towards her cubs is cited proverbially three times (2 Sam. 17:8; Prov. 17:12; Hos. 13:8) in the Hebrew Bible. The Syrian brown bear is also mentioned in 2 Kings 2:23-25 mauling 42 young men who were threatening Elisha.

Wojtek (1942–1963) was a Syrian brown bear. Purchased by Polish soldiers in Iran during World War II, Wojtek became the company mascot. Initially given the rank of private in order to justify his presence in the military camp, he was subsequently promoted to corporal and assisted the soldiers in loading artillery. After the war, Wojtek retired to the Edinburgh Zoo where he became a popular and beloved attraction. His military service is memorialized in Scotland and Poland.

References

External links 

 Syrian brown bear camera trap footage in the Caucasus Wildlife refuge, Armenia from World Land Trust
 Syrian brown bear in Iraq

Eurasian brown bears
Carnivorans of Asia
Mammals of the Middle East
Carnivorans of Europe
Mammals of Azerbaijan
Fauna of Iran
Fauna of Iraq
Fauna of Turkey
Fauna of Syria
Mammals described in 1828
Taxa named by Christian Gottfried Ehrenberg
Taxa named by Wilhelm Hemprich